En-me-nuna of Kish was the fifteenth Sumerian king in the First Dynasty of Kish, according to the Sumerian King List. The kings on the early part of the SKL are usually not considered historical, except when they are mentioned in Early Dynastic documents. En-me-nuna is not one of them.

References 

|-

Kings of Kish
Sumerian kings